The 2011 Sanfrecce Hiroshima season is Sanfrecce Hiroshima's 3rd consecutive season, 17th season overall in J.League Division 1 and 40th overall in the Japanese top flight. It also includes the 2011 J.League Cup, and the 2011 Emperor's Cup.

Players
As of July 22, 2011

Competitions

J.League

League table

Results summary

1Game postponed because of Tōhoku earthquake.

Results by round

J.League Cup

Sanfrecce Hiroshima lost 5-3 on aggregate

Emperor's Cup

References

Sanfrecce Hiroshima
Sanfrecce Hiroshima seasons